Fusulculus is a genus of sea snails, marine gastropod mollusks in the family Benthobiidae.

Species
Species within the genus Fusulculus include:
 Fusulculus albus Bouchet & Vermeij, 1998
 † Fusulculus alienopriscus Pacaud & Tracey, 2000 
 † Fusulculus antiquus (Vincent, 1878) 
 Fusulculus crenatus Bouchet & Vermeij, 1998
 † Fusulculus curryi Pacaud & Tracey, 2000 
 † Fusulculus hanseni Pacaud, 2020 
 † Fusulculus koeneni (Ravn, 1939) 
 † Fusulculus macnairyensis (Wade, 1917) 
 † Fusulculus multinodulosus (Vermeij, 1998) 
 † Fusulculus nanapullus Pacaud & Schnetler, 1999 
 † Fusulculus nodulosus (Beyrich, 1854) 
 † Fusulculus perminutus (Cossmann, 1923) 
 † Fusulculus priscus (Deshayes, 1862) 
 † Fusulculus pusillus (Beyrich, 1854) 
 † Fusulculus rosenkrantzi (Traub, 1979)

References

 Bouchet P. & Vermeij G. (1998). Two new deep-water Pseudolividae (Neogastropoda) from the south-west Pacific. The Nautilus 111(2): 47-52.

External links
 Vermeij G. (1998). Generic revision of the neogastropod family Pseudolividae. The Nautilus 111(2): 53-84

 
Gastropod genera